The 2008 Football Federation South Australia season was the 102nd season of soccer in South Australia, and the third under the FFSA format.

2008 FFSA Super League

The 2008 South Australian Super League was the third edition of the South Australian Super League, the top level domestic association football competition in South Australia, and was the first season to use a finals system, with the top five teams in the league progressing to the finals. The number of teams relegated to the South Australian Premier League also increased from one to two. The league was won by Adelaide City after they beat the North Eastern MetroStars 2–0 in the Grand Final.

League table

Finals

2008 FFSA Premier League

The 2008 FFSA Premier League was the third edition of the FFSA Premier League as the second level domestic association football competition in South Australia. 10 teams competed, all playing each other twice for a total of 18 rounds, with the top five at the end of the year qualifying for the McIntyre final five finals system to determine 1st to 5th place. The League winners and second placers were promoted to the 2009 FFSA Super League, and the bottom two placed teams relegated to the 2009 FFSA State League.

League table

Finals

2008 FFSA State League

The 2008 FFSA State League was the third edition of the FFSA State League as the third level domestic association football competition in South Australia. 10 teams competed, all playing each other twice for a total of 18 rounds. The League winners and second placers were promoted to the 2009 FFSA Premier League.

League table

Finals

See also
2008 FFSA Premier League
2008 FFSA Super League
2008 FFSA State League
National Premier Leagues South Australia
Football Federation South Australia

References

2008 in Australian soccer
Football South Australia seasons